Pykulovychi, also known as Pikulovychi is a rural locality (selo) in Lviv Raion of Lviv Oblast, Ukraine, located  east of the city of Lviv. It belongs to Novyi Yarychiv settlement hromada, one of the hromadas of Ukraine. When the area belonged to Poland (1918–1939) the village was also known as Pikulovitse.

Pykulovychi was first mentioned in 1464. In the selo, a wooden Church of the Saint Mary survived. The church was built in 1794 in the traditions of Galician wooden architecture, with three domes, and is designated as a monument of architecture.

Until 18 July 2020, Pykulovychi belonged to Pustomyty Raion. The raion was abolished in July 2020 as part of the administrative reform of Ukraine, which reduced the number of raions of Lviv Oblast to seven. The area of Pustomyty Raion was merged into Lviv Raion.

References

Notes

Sources
 Website of the village Pykulovychi;
 Essay village Pykulovychi - author: Andreyko Alexander P. - 2007

Villages in Lviv Raion